Maidenhead Boyne Hill railway station was built by the Wycombe Railway to serve the western part of Maidenhead. It was opened in 1854 and closed in 1871.

History
The station was opened on 1 August 1854 along with five other intermediate stations on the Wycombe Railway's route between Maidenhead and Wycombe. It was situated on Castle Hill close to the point where the line passes under the Bath Road (the present day A4).

The station, at first named Maidenhead (Wycombe Branch), was later renamed Maidenhead (Boyne Hill).

Maidenhead Boyne Hill closed on 1 November 1871, being replaced the same day by Maidenhead Junction, a new station which was built to serve the whole of Maidenhead. The bricked up arches which led to the platforms can still be seen in the southern parapet of the bridge, beneath the footpath.

Route

Notes

References

External links

Maidenhead to Marlow Line
Maidenhead Boyne Hill Station - the remains still visible in 2012

Disused railway stations in Berkshire
Former Great Western Railway stations
Railway stations in Great Britain opened in 1854
Railway stations in Great Britain closed in 1871